Kingsweston Iron Bridge is a footbridge in Sea Mills, Bristol, UK, that crosses the B4057 (Kings Weston Road).

History 
On 8 January 1959 the bridge was Grade II listed.

The bridge was struck and damaged by an unknown lorry on 5 November 2015. It was subsequently closed to pedestrians. Bristol City Council committed to repairing the bridge. A campaign group Save the Iron Bridge was later formed. The group has raised concerns for pedestrian safety as pedestrians have to cross King Weston Road while the bridge is closed.

In March 2019, plans to repair the bridge and raise it were released. The council stated that it would fund the work once it received approval from Historic England. However, in 2021 the council withdrew its planning application to repair the bridge, saying it was in continued discussion with Historic England. The council subsequently said it may not have adequate funds to repair the bridge.

In 2022, the council allocated money in its yearly budget for repairs to the bridge. In May 2022, the council again applied for planning permission to raise the bridge. Work to repair the bridge is set to begin in 2024.

Modifications 
Ramps were initially planned for accessibility; however, these were eliminated as they were deemed "too damaging to the historic surroundings".

References 

Bridges in Bristol
Pedestrian bridges in England